Palicourea prodiga is a species of plant in the family Rubiaceae. It is endemic to Ecuador.

References

Flora of Ecuador
prodiga
Vulnerable plants
Taxonomy articles created by Polbot
Plants described in 1997